Hopeful Lutheran Church was chartered on January 6, 1806. It was founded by a group of colonists from Virginia who settled in Boone County. In 1807, the first log church was built on an acre of donated land. Hopeful did not have a full-time pastor until October 1813 when Rev. William Carpenter (a Revolutionary War veteran) moved to Boone County to be the first Pastor.

While fires destroyed the first three structures, the current church building was finished in 1917 in Florence, Kentucky.  This  is  the  fourth  church  structure  on  the site serving the same Lutheran  congregation.

A group  of  14  families associated with the Hebron Lutheran Church of Germanna,  Madison  Co. VA, settled  in  Boone  County in  1805.  Family names included Hoffman,  Rouse,  Tanner, Hanse,  Carpenter,  and  Zimmermann.  Their descendants are well represented in the current population of Boone County.  Hopeful  Lutheran Church was  the  first Lutheran church in the county and its first regular pastor, William Carpenter, moved to the area in 1813.

References

External links
 

Churches on the National Register of Historic Places in Kentucky
Gothic Revival church buildings in Kentucky
Churches completed in 1917
20th-century Lutheran churches in the United States
Churches in Boone County, Kentucky
Lutheran churches in Kentucky
National Register of Historic Places in Boone County, Kentucky
1917 establishments in Kentucky
Florence, Kentucky